James Sample (born June 23, 1992) is a former American football safety. He played college football at Washington and Louisville, and was drafted by the Jacksonville Jaguars in the fourth round of the 2015 NFL Draft. Sample had also been a member of the Washington Redskins and Toronto Argonauts (CFL).

Early years
Sample attended Grant Union High School in Sacramento, California, where he was teammates with Viliami Moala and Shaq Thompson on the football team. As a junior, he was named first-team All-Metro and a PrepStar All-American as he helped lead Grant to a 12-1 record, totaling 111 tackles. He recorded 109 tackles as a senior at Grant, being named a high school All-American and was voted to participate in the U.S. Army All-America Bowl. He was also named first-team All-CIF San Joaquin Section, first-team All-Metro by the Sacramento Bee, first-team All-Delta Valley Conference, and first-team All-NorCal by NorCalPreps.com. He was dubbed a third-team All-state performer by ESPN.com in 2011.

Also a standout in track & field Sample was a state qualifier sprinter. At Grant Union High School, he posted personal-best times of 11.1 seconds in the 100-meter dash and 23.37 seconds in the 200-meter dash. He was also a member of the 4 × 100 m squad.

He was rated by Rivals.com as a four-star recruit. He committed to the University of Washington to play college football.

College career
Sample attended Washington from 2011 to 2012. After playing in five games over two years, Sample left Washington and transferred to American River College. After one year at American River College, he transferred to the University of Louisville in 2014. He played in 13 games, recording 90 tackles and four interceptions. After the season, he entered the 2015 NFL Draft, forgoing his senior year.

Professional career

Jacksonville Jaguars
Sample was drafted by the Jacksonville Jaguars in the fourth round of the 2015 NFL Draft with the 104th overall pick. He played in four games with two starts his rookie year before suffering a shoulder injury in Week 4, keeping him out the rest of the season. On August 30, 2016, Sample was placed on injured reserve with a shoulder injury. On August 6, 2017, Sample was released by the Jaguars.

Washington Redskins
On January 1, 2018, Sample signed a reserve/future contract with the Washington Redskins. He was released on April 30, 2018.

Toronto Argonauts
Sample signed with the Toronto Argonauts of the CFL on January 27, 2020. He signed a contract extension with the team on December 21, 2020. He was placed on the suspended list on July 10, 2021. On May 12, 2022 the Argos placed Sample on the retired list. He never made an appearance for Toronto.

References

External links
Louisville Cardinals bio
Washington Huskes bio
CFL bio

1992 births
Living people
Players of American football from Sacramento, California
American football safeties
Washington Huskies football players
American River Beavers football players
Louisville Cardinals football players
Jacksonville Jaguars players
Washington Redskins players
Toronto Argonauts players